Paul Kunz (December 20, 1942 – September 12, 2018) was an American Particle physicist and software developer, who initiated the deployment of the first web server outside of Europe.  After a meeting in September with Tim Berners-Lee of CERN, he returned to the Stanford Linear Accelerator Center with word of the World Wide Web.  By Thursday, December 12, 1991 there was an active web server, SPIRES HEP in place thanks to the efforts of Kunz, Louise Addis, and Terry Hung.

He was also the originator of the free/open source GNUstep implementation of the NeXTSTEP framework and the idea for objcX.  He was the chief developer of HippoDraw.

External links
"GNUstep: Who's Who Developers"
"Early World Wide Web at SLAC"

References

1942 births
2018 deaths
Particle physicists